Darragh Joyce (born 23 April 1997) is a professional Australian rules footballer playing for the  in the Australian Football League (AFL), after originally being recruited to the St Kilda Football Club. He made his debut in round 15 of the 2018 season against Melbourne at the Melbourne Cricket Ground.

AFL career
Joyce is originally from Ireland and played hurling for his county Kilkenny and also for club Rower-Inistioge. He tested at the 2015 AFL Draft Combine, but did not sign with a club because of concerns about homesickness. Joyce trialled with St Kilda in June 2016, and joined as a Category B International Rookie before the 2017 season. He played for St Kilda's Victorian Football League affiliate Sandringham, but struggled for form and was dropped to the reserves. Coach Lindsay Gilbee commented that "[Joyce] came back a much better player". Joyce signed a two-year contract extension in July 2019, extending his stay until the end of 2021. Joyce was delisted by the Saints at the end of 2022, but was later picked up as a rookie by the  ahead of the 2023 AFL season.

Family
Joyce is the brother of former Kilkenny hurler Kieran Joyce and the cousin of former Essendon footballer Kevin Walsh.

References

External links 

 
 

Living people
1997 births
Kilkenny hurlers
St Kilda Football Club players
Sandringham Football Club players

Irish players of Australian rules football
Irish expatriate sportspeople in Australia